Elikia Joël Mbinga (born 8 March 2001) is a Dutch professional footballer who plays as a midfielder for VVOG.

Club career
On 2 January 2023, Mbinga signed a 1.5-year contract with fourth-tier Derde Divisie club VVOG.

References

2001 births
Living people
Dutch footballers
Association football midfielders
PEC Zwolle players
VVOG players
Eredivisie players